This is a list of phenomena specific to the Internet within Pakistan that influenced Pakistan and other countries' internet culture a lot.

In July 2016, an elderly Pakistani woman from Karachi said this (lit. This government is sold out) while being interviewed by Waqt News, and it became the biggest meme in Pakistan in 2016. The woman went on to say that, "" (together these people are deceiving us), after which she spewed a list of expletives. The video of the woman going on an abusive rant against the government went viral, and memes followed. When the video hit social media again in 2017, it became a viral meme. According to the India Today, the woman said "what every common man feels deep down inside - that their government is corrupted - and this applies for people across the world". It was also parodied by actor Irrfan Khan.

On 16 March 2018, Dr. Faheem Amir, a staff member of Dow University's hospital in Karachi, the capital city of Sindh, handed a showcause notice to Dr. Rabia Bibi for speaking with patients in the Sindhi language and imposed a ban on speaking Sindhi in campus. In response, the staffers and students of the hospital recorded protest against Amir. Later, the protest spread all over Sindh and protesters used the slogan "", which means "Sindhi is a national language" and it became a demand with the hashtag #SindhiBoliQomiBoli trended on Twitter. Meanwhile, the protests were recorded all over the Sindh, where people demanded action against administration of DOW University Hospital. People also demanded the government to recognize Sindhi as a national and official language of Pakistan.

Chief Minister of Sindh Syed Murad Ali Shah took notice of the incident. The government of Sindh posted banners in Sindhi to welcome the finalists of the Pakistan Super League after the play off between Karachi Kings and Peshawar Zalmi. Javed Afridi, owner of Peshawar Zalmi, tweeted in Sindhi from his official Twitter account. In tweet, he thanked people of Sindh for their love and support.

In February 2021, 19-year-old Islamabadian Dananeer Mubeen made a short video with her friends portraying a mockery of "burger people", which is Pakistani slang for those who try to emulate Western culture, saying, "Yeh hamari car hai, aur yeh hum hein aur yeh hamari pawri ho rai hai!" (This is our car, and these are us, and this is our party taking place!)

The video went viral on social media and started a meme trend by people and celebrities joining the bandwagon by making videos. The video also became viral in neighboring India after Yashraj Mukhate's composition, and in both the countries different hashtags #PawriHoRaiHai #PawriHoRahiHai #PawriHoriHai trended on Twitter with people, celebrities, brands and organizations posted following the trend.

Kanpen tang rahe hain
Kanpen tang rahe hain  is Spoonerism. Bilawal Bhutto Zardari was addressing the "Awami March" in Islamabad in March 2022. During his speech said "Islamabad me tangen kanp rahi hain" (Legs are shivering in Islamabad). By saying this he wanted to mock the incumbent PTI-led government for having a hard time. However, instead he said "Islamabad me kanpen taang rahi hain", mistakenly swapping a couple of Urdu letters. Now almost every politician saying "Kanpen tang rahi hain" to show hardtime of his opponent. Bilawal said this is not slip of tongue, Vedio made by forgery.

Notes

References

Internet in Pakistan
Political Internet memes